Sri Krishnadevaraya University College of Engineering and Technology came into existence in 2006 to mark the Silver Jubilee celebrations of the Sri Krishnadevaraya University. It offers four engineering branches — Computer Science and Engineering, Electronics and Communications Engineering, and Biotech initially with Electrical and Electronics Engineering from the academic year 2009-10.

Location 
The college is in Anantapur district, Andhra Pradesh, India, 10 km from Anantapur city bus stand and railway station.

References

External links 
 S K U College of Engineering and Technology Official website

Engineering colleges in Andhra Pradesh
Universities and colleges in Anantapur district
Educational institutions established in 2006
2006 establishments in Andhra Pradesh